Visa requirements for Bhutanese citizens are administrative entry restrictions by the authorities of other states placed on citizens of Bhutan. As of 2 July 2019, Bhutanese citizens had visa-free or visa on arrival access to 52 countries and territories, ranking the Bhutanese passport 92nd in terms of travel freedom (tied with passports from Chad and Comoros) according to the Henley Passport Index.

Visa requirements map

Visa requirements

Non-visa restrictions

See also

Visa policy of Bhutan
Bhutanese passport
Foreign relations of Bhutan

References and Notes
References

Notes

Bhutan
Foreign relations of Bhutan